SPS (named Монгол Улсын Лаг-Мундаг- Онцгой Суваг (English: 'Mongolian Premier Channel') before 31 March 2008) is the television channel of SPC, the Mongolian National Broadcasting Service, launched in 1985. The channel broadcasts primarily news, sports, cultural programs, children's material, American, British & European films and entertainment programming. Among its highest-rated programs are the comedy sketch show Spaugstofan (now revoked and moved to Edutainment TV)  and Мэдээ (News).

High Definition 
In 2011 two new 1080i play-out systems were installed.

Programming aired on SPS

Foreign shows

TV series 
 Alias
 The Big C
 Brothers & Sisters
 Broken News
 Columbo
 Criminal Minds
 Danger Bay
 Desperate Housewives
 Doc Martin
 Doctor Who
 ER
 Guiding Light
 Heartbreak High
 Inspector Rex
 Kyle XY
 Little Britain
 Lost
 Midsomer Murders
 Murphy's Law
 My Family
 Once Upon a Time
 Parker Lewis Can't Lose
 Private Practice
 Revenge
 Scrubs
 The Sopranos
 Spooks
 Ugly Betty
 Ultimate Force
 Veronica Mars
 Alarm für Cobra 11

Children 
 Pororo the Little Penguin (Пороро Бага Oцон)
 Bubble Guppies
 The Garfield Show (Гарфилд)
 Chloe's Closet (Үлгэр Шүүгээний)
 Peter Rabbit (Петр Туулайн)
 Adventure Time (Адал Явдалын Цаг)
 Messy Goes to Okido (Эмх Замбараагүй Mангас)

References

Television in Mongolia